AAXICO was an airline based in the United States.

History 

AAXICO, the American Air Export and Import Company, was founded in 1946 in Miami Beach, Florida.

AAXICO's initial flight service consisted of five daily flights from New York to Atlantic City geared toward the horse racing industry, with the last flight scheduled to wait until after the last race. By 1956, AAXICO was registered as an all-cargo airline. AAXICO temporarily suspended flight operations on June 30, 1960, in negotiations with Air Line Pilots Association, International. Prior to its merger, AAXICO had a Department of Defense contract to carry 25,000 lbs of cargo daily. Its airline operations ceased in 1966, when they were sold to Saturn Airways.

AAXICO is now an airline support company based in Doral, Florida.

Destinations 
Miami

Fleet 

The AAXICO fleet consisted of the following aircraft:

Incidents and accidents 

AAxico Airlines, Inc., C-46-F, N67941, near Great Falls, Montana, August 14, 1963
AAxico Airlines, Inc., C-46-F, N67935, McCarran Field, Las Vegas, Nevada, September 25, 1963
Aaxico Airlines, Inc., Douglas DC-6A, N6541C, West Slope of Mt. Rainier, Washington, April 23, 1965
DC-6A, N6579C, on May 18, 1967, crash

See also 
 List of defunct airlines of the United States

References

External links
 AAXICO

Defunct airlines of the United States
Airlines established in 1946
Airlines disestablished in 1966
Companies based in Doral, Florida
1946 establishments in Florida
1966 disestablishments in Florida
American companies established in 1946
1966 mergers and acquisitions
Airlines based in Florida